The Tarpon Springs Aquarium and Animal Sanctuary is privately-owned aquarium located in Tarpon Springs, Florida. The Konger family opened this business on the sponge docks in 1990. It has since passed hands through the family and is now owned and operated by Grant Konger and Paige Konger-Henry. The brother and sister duo have moved the aquarium to a new location where they are constantly expanding and building new exhibits for animal acquisitions and rescues. The new facility opened in 2021.

Exhibits

There are several exhibits at the Tarpon Springs Aquarium and Animal Sanctuary including Marine Life, Reptiles, and Zoo Animals. 

The Marine Life includes but is not limited to; Stingrays, Game Fish, Tropical Fish, Sharks, Snails, Crabs, Horseshoe Crabs, Lobsters, Terrapins, Turtles, Urchins, and Invertebrates. 

The Reptile Exhibit includes but is not limited to; Alligators, Crocodiles, Iguanas, Non-Venomous Snakes, Venomous Snakes, Turtles, Tortoises, Bearded Dragons, Leopard Geckos, Chameleons, Chinese-Water Dragons, Asian Water Monitors, and Basilisk Lizards.

The Zoo Animal Exhibit includes but is not limited to; Goats, Pigs, Chickens, Ducks, and Bunnies. 

They also have one bird and a frog.

Sources

Aquaria in Florida
Buildings and structures in Tarpon Springs, Florida
Tourist attractions in Pinellas County, Florida